Benita Raphan (November 5, 1962, New York City – January 10, 2021, New York City) was an American filmmaker and designer. She was known for directing short documentary films about "eccentric and unusual minds", including John Nash, Buckminster Fuller, Edwin Land and Emily Dickinson.

Raphan received her undergraduate degree from the School of Visual Arts in New York City and her Master of Fine Arts degree from the Royal College of Art in London. She spent 10 years in Paris as a graphic designer for various fashion companies and came back to New York in mid-1990s. She taught at the School of Visual Arts for the last 15 years of her life.

She received a MacDowell Fellowship in 2004. Her films have been bought for the collections of the British Film & Video Artists' Film Study Collection and the Walker Art Center, and her design collages are in the permanent collection of the Cooper Hewitt National Design Museum.  She was awarded a 2019 Guggenheim fellowship.

References

External links

Official Website
Vimeo Channel

American film directors
1962 births
2021 deaths
School of Visual Arts alumni
School of Visual Arts faculty